Rhett Walton is an Australian actor who has appeared in various theatre, film and television productions, including the soap operas Families and Home & Away.  He is a National Institute of Dramatic Arts (NIDA) graduate, from the class of 1985, where he studied alongside his future wife, Sonia Todd.  Other classmates included Baz Luhrmann and Catherine McClements.

He is also a scriptwriter, writing for the children's television series Outriders, Fairy Tale Police Department, Tabaluga, Flipper and Lopaka, Blinky Bill, Pig's Breakfast and the drama series Big Sky.

References

External links

Australian male soap opera actors
Year of birth missing (living people)
Living people
Australian male film actors
Australian male television writers
Australian television writers
Blinky Bill